for outstanding achievements in the Broadcast Music Producers Federation, was major music awards show held annually in Japan from 1969 to 1993. The 1988 awards ceremony was cancelled due to the deteriorating health of Emperor Shōwa.

List of Japan Music Award winners

Members of Federation 
Nippon Television
Fuji Television
TV Asahi
TV Tokyo
Nippon Cultural Broadcasting
Nippon Broadcasting System
Radio Nippon
Tokyo FM

Venues 
 1970-1971: Keio Plaza Hotel
 1972: Shinjuku Koma Theater
 1975: Nakano Sun Plaza
 1973 - 1974, 1976-1978, 1980-1987, 1989-1992: Nippon Budokan
 1979: NHK Hall
 1993: Tokyo Bay NK Hall

See also 
 American Music Award (similar American music show)

References 
 音楽・芸能賞事典 Nichigai Associates 
 音楽・芸能賞事典 Nichigai Associates 1990/95 

Japanese music awards
Awards established in 1969
Awards disestablished in 1993
1969 establishments in Japan
1993 disestablishments in Japan